Garli is a cabin area in the northern part of Beitostølen in Øystre Slidre, Norway.

Øystre Slidre